Portskewett railway station is a former station serving Portskewett, Wales, four miles south west of Chepstow and one mile east of Caldicot. It was opened as a broad gauge line with the South Wales Railway in 1850 and closed to passengers in 1964.

Between 8 September 1863 and 1886 the station was known as Portskewett Junction, where the Bristol and South Wales Union Railway diverged for the New Passage Ferry crossing to Bristol. This new station was at a location 800 yards east of the original location. The opening of the Severn Tunnel in 1886 made the ferry at Black Rock redundant.

The station was twin platform with a footbridge. The footbridge and the twin track line remain in use today.

Portskewett Pier railway station was opened on 1 January 1864 and closed 1 December 1886.

References

External links
 Portskewett Railways
 Photograph gallery

Disused railway stations in Monmouthshire
South Wales Railway
Railway stations in Great Britain opened in 1850
Railway stations in Great Britain closed in 1964
1850 establishments in the United Kingdom
1964 disestablishments in the United Kingdom
Former Great Western Railway stations